James Peter Quinn (4 December 1869 – 18 February 1951) was an Australian portrait painter born in Melbourne.

Biography 
He studied part-time under Frederick McCubbin 1887–1999, at the Melbourne's National Gallery of Victoria Art School under George Folingsby and Bernard Hall 1889–1893, then in Paris at the Académie Julian and the École des Beaux-Arts from 1893–1901 under Jean Paul Laurens aided by a National Gallery of Victoria travelling scholarship. He spent time painting at the Etaples art colony in northern France, alongside other Australians including Rupert Bunny and Hilda Rix Nicholas.

By 1904, he was a highly successful portrait painter and exhibited at the Royal Academy of Arts. His Mère et Fils (of his wife and son), was awarded an honourable mention at the Salon, Paris, in 1912. He was commissioned to paint Joseph Chamberlain, the Duchess of York and the Duke of Windsor.

He was accredited official war artist for the First AIF during World War I, painting prominent officers in France (causing considerable friction with authorities and fellow artists).

In 1919 in London, Quinn painted General Sir John Monash, Commander in Chief of the Australian Corps.  Monash, credited as the most resourceful and innovative General of WW1, planned and carried out with his 5 Australian Divisions, and the Canadian Corps on their right flank, the significant victory at the Battle of Amiens, 8 Aug 1918 - 0808 - which brought about the earlier than expected end to WW1. Quinn's portrait belonged to the Monash-Bennett family mantel until being gifted to the National Portrait Gallery of Australia, Canberra. This portrait was the model for the Monash Medal awarded each year to an Outstanding Australian for her/his contribution in Leadership, Integrity, and Service to the Australian community and beyond.

Then from 1919, Quinn worked with Canadian War Records, only returning to Australia in December 1935 after the death of son René. He rejoined the highly conservative Victorian Artists Society and was even president for a record 12 years, and in 1937 he became a foundation member of, and exhibited with, Robert Menzies' anti-modernist organisation, the Australian Academy of Art. His openness to modern art made him no friends and was later the basis of a public confrontation with Prime Minister Robert Menzies. However, he continued exhibiting his paintings and taught at the National Gallery of Victoria Art School. His work was also part of the painting event in the art competition at the 1932 Summer Olympics.

A commemorative exhibition was held at the Victorian Centre for the Arts in 1980.

Exhibitions  
 1943, from 1 December; Inclusion in a group show of ninety-one paintings and etchings with Arnold Shore, Max Meldrum, John Rowell, Allan Jordan, John Farmer, Mary Hurry, Dora Serle, Margaret Pestell, Dora Wilson, Isabel Tweddle, Aileen Dent, Murray Griffin, Geo. Colville, and Victor Cog. Hawthorn Library.

Selected works
The National Library of Australia hosts three works by Quinn:
My Friend Harold Parker
Portrait of Richard Gardiner Casey
Dr Cecil John Davenport

The collection of the Australian War Memorial, Canberra includes a number of his war portraits, e.g.,
Sir Harry Chauvel, 1919
Lieutenant-General Sir John Monash GCMG KCB, 1918
William Riddell Birdwood (Baron Birdwood)
Queen Elizabeth (later known as the Queen Mother), 1936

References

Further reading
 Art in Australia no.8 1921

External links

 More works by Quinn @ ArtNet

1869 births
1951 deaths
19th-century Australian painters
19th-century Australian male artists
20th-century Australian painters
20th-century Australian male artists
Olympic competitors in art competitions
Australian male painters
National Gallery of Victoria Art School alumni
Artists from Melbourne